Razmgah-e Olya (also Romanized as Razmgāh-e ‘Olyā; also known as Razmgāh and Razmgāh-e Bālā) is a village in Sefid Sang Rural District, Qalandarabad District, Fariman County, Razavi Khorasan Province, Iran. At the 2006 census, its population was 111, in 26 families.

References 

Populated places in Fariman County